Thomas Olsen may refer to:

 Thomas Olsen (soccer) (born 1995), American soccer player
 Thomas David Lukas Olsen (born 1975), German murderer
 Thomas Lehne Olsen (born 1991), Norwegian footballer
 Thomas Fredrik Olsen (1897–1969), Norwegian ship-owner
 Thomas R. Olsen (1934–2014), United States Air Force general
 Thomas Valkvæ Olsen (born 1993), Norwegian ice hockey player
 Tom Strømstad Olsen (born 1971), Norwegian politician
 Tommy Olsen (born 1973), Danish football manager and former player
 Tommy Olsen (orienteer), Norwegian ski-orienteering competitor
 Thomas Kjær Olsen (born 1997), Danish motocross rider